Southern Pacific #8 is a  narrow-gauge steam locomotive, built by Baldwin Locomotive Works in August 1907.

It was originally built for the Nevada–California–Oregon Railway as their second #8, and was sold to Southern Pacific in 1929. She spent the rest of its career hauling passengers and freight along Southern Pacific's Keeler Branch.  The locomotive, along with sisters #9 and #18 were nicknamed "The Desert Princesses", having served the desert areas of Nevada and California.

In 1954, an  GE 50 Ton diesel locomotive was purchased, relegating steam power on the Southern Pacific's narrow-gauge line to backup duty. Locomotive #8 was retired in 1955 after 48 years of service and donated to the State of Nevada. Now owned by the Nevada State Railroad Museum, it has been on display at Lillard Park at Sparks, Nevada since 1975 after negotiations of a long-term loan.

See also 
 Southern Pacific 9
 Southern Pacific 18

References

External links
 Nevada State Railroad Museum
 https://c1.staticflickr.com/6/5030/5686584026_d534a91817_b.jpg
 http://www.pacificng.com/imglib/main.php?g2_itemId=11020&g2_imageViewsIndex=2 Spec sheets for SPng/N-C-O #8 courtesy of Pacificng.com.

0008
4-6-0 locomotives
Baldwin locomotives
3 ft gauge locomotives
Railway locomotives introduced in 1907
Preserved steam locomotives of Nevada
Sparks, Nevada